This is a list of laptop brands and manufacturers.

Manufacturers

Major brands

Other brands

No longer manufacturing computers

Defunct brands

Original design manufacturers (ODMs) 
The vast majority of laptops on the market are manufactured by a small handful of Taiwan-based original design manufacturers (ODM), although their production bases are located mostly in mainland China. Quanta Computer pioneered the contract manufacturing of laptops in 1988. By 1990, Taiwanese companies manufactured 11% of the world's laptops. That percentage grew to 32% in 1996, 50% in 2000, 80% in 2007 and 94% in 2011. The Taiwanese ODMs have since lost some market share to Chinese ODMs, but still manufactured 82.3% of the world's laptops in Q2 of 2019, according to IDC.

Major relationships include:
 Quanta sells to (among others) HP, Lenovo, Apple, Acer, Dell, NEC, and Fujitsu
 Compal sells to (among others) Acer, Dell, Lenovo and HP
 Wistron (former manufacturing & design division of Acer) sells to Dell, Acer, Lenovo and HP
 Inventec sells to HP, Dell and Lenovo;
 Pegatron (in 2010, Asus spun off Pegatron) sells to Asus, Apple, Dell, Acer and Microsoft
 Foxconn sells to Asus, Dell, HP and Apple
 Flextronics (former Arima Computer Corporation notebook division) sells to HP
 Clevo sells to different laptop manufacturers like Digital Storm, Eluktronics, Eurocom, Metabox, Sager, Schenker, System76, XMG, etc.
 Maibenben

ODM laptop units sold and market shares 

There is a discrepancy between the 2009 numbers due to the various sources cited; i.e. the units sold by all ODMs add up to 144.3 million laptops, which is much more than the given total of 125 million laptops. The market share percentages currently refer to those 144.3 million total. Sources may indicate hard drive deliveries to the ODM instead of actual laptop sales, though the two numbers may be closely correlated.

See also 
 List of computer hardware manufacturers
 List of computer system manufacturers

References 

Laptops
 
laptop
Lists of consumer electronics manufacturers
 Laptop